Raymond Fisher Jones (15 November 1915 – 24 January 1994) was an American science fiction author. He is best known for his 1952 novel This Island Earth, which was adapted into the eponymous 1955 film.

Personal life
Jones was born at Salt Lake City, Utah, and was a member of the Church of Jesus Christ of Latter-day Saints from birth. He died at Sandy, Utah, in 1994.

Career
Most of Jones' short fiction was published during the 1940s, 1950s, and 1960s, in magazines such as Thrilling Wonder Stories, Astounding Stories, and Galaxy.  His sixteen novels were published between 1951 and 1978.

His short story "Rat Race", first published in the April 1966 issue of Analog Science Fiction and Fact, was nominated for a Hugo Award. In 1996, "Correspondence Course", first published in the April 1945 edition of Astounding Stories, was nominated for a Retro Hugo award for best short story. Another short story, "The Alien Machine", first published in the June 1949 edition of Thrilling Wonder Stories, was later combined with two other short stories, "The Shroud of Secrecy" and "The Greater Conflict", and expanded into the novel This Island Earth, upon which the movie of the same name was based.

Jones also wrote the story upon which a 1952 Tales of Tomorrow television program episode, titled "The Children's Room", was based.

Jones short story, "Tools of the Trade", that appeared in the November 1950 issue of Astounding, was the first story dealing with 3D printing, although he called it "Molecular Spray" at the time.

In 1978 three of his stories were dramatized & released through audio cassette by AudiSee: The Renegades of Time (The Lost One's), The King Of Eolim (The Star Prince) & The Rebels Of Empiria. All three adaptations where sold with an accompanying art-filled booklet.

Bibliography

Novels and collections

 The Alien (1951), 
 Renaissance (1951), 
 The Toymaker (1951), 
 Son of the Stars (1952), 
 This Island Earth (1952), 
 Planet of Light (1953), 
 The Secret People (1956), 
 The Year When Stardust Fell (1958), 
 The Cybernetic Brains (1962), 
 The Non-Statistical Man (1964), 
 Voyage to the Bottom of the Sea (1965), 
 Syn (1969),

Short stories

Gutenberg Project
Nine of his books have been made available for free by the Gutenberg Project, despite their recent publication, because they fell into the public domain when the original copyright was not renewed: The Great Gray Plague, The Memory of Mars, Cubs of the Wolf,  The Colonists, The Year When Stardust Fell, The Unlearned, The Alien, and Human Error, plus the Japanese book 火星の記憶.

References

External links

 
 
 
 

American science fiction writers
1915 births
1994 deaths
Writers from Salt Lake City
Latter Day Saints from Utah
American male novelists
20th-century American novelists
20th-century American male writers
Novelists from Utah